Halfdan Holth (1880 – 1950) was a Norwegian veterinarian.

He was born in Nord-Odal, Hedmark. He became a professor at the National Veterinary Institute in 1914, and managing director in 1917. From 1917 to 1930 he also edited the journal Norsk veterinærtidsskrift. He was later instrumental in the creation of the Norwegian School of Veterinary Science, and served as its first rector from 1936 to 1948.

Holth was also noted for his work to eliminate the diseases bovine tuberculosis and brucellosis, together with Niels Thorshaug and Lars Slagsvold.

References

1880 births
1950 deaths
People from Nord-Odal
Norwegian veterinarians
Academic staff of the Norwegian School of Veterinary Science
Rectors of the Norwegian School of Veterinary Science